"Pain" is a song by English singer-songwriter PinkPantheress. It was released on 7 June 2021 through Elektra and Parlophone Records, as the second single from her debut mixtape To Hell with It. A snippet of the song went viral on TikTok months prior, and it subsequently peaked at number 35 on the UK Singles Chart and at number 54 in Ireland.

Background and composition
In early 2021, PinkPantheress started recording one song a day, taking an hour a day after coming home from university to write and record 20-second loops, which she posted as short-form videos on the social media platform TikTok to reach a wider audience. In January 2021, one of these loops, a 12-second snippet of her song "Pain", was posted to TikTok with the caption, "Day 11 of posting a song every day bc  i have nothing else to do," and it quickly gained attention on the platform.

Produced by PinkPantheress, "Pain" is a UK garage song which runs for one minute and 38 seconds and samples the 2000 single "Flowers" by UK garage duo Sweet Female Attitude. On it, PinkPantheress addresses her longing for an ex over a "woozy", two-chord keyboard loop and a lofi hip hop beat, and sings "la la las" throughout the song, which were inspired by her writer's block. The piano part is a sampled version of French pianist Erik Satie's "Trois Gymnopédies".

Reception and commercial performance
Gigwises Joe Smith described "Pain" as "a mish-mash of Britain's urban landscapes".

"Pain" peaked at number 35 on the UK Singles Chart and at number 54 in Ireland.

Credits and personnel
Credits adapted from AllMusic.
PinkPantheressvocals, songwriting, production, programming, mastering

Charts

Certifications

References

2021 songs
2021 singles
PinkPantheress songs
Parlophone singles
Elektra Records singles
UK garage songs